Foxtel 3D was an Australian television channel owned and operated by Foxtel, and dedicated to 3D programming. The channel comprises mainly sports programming from ESPN/ESPN 3D and FOX Sports.

In July 2013, following the news that ESPN 3D and BBC were ceasing 3D productions in 2013, Foxtel announced that Foxtel 3D would cease broadcasting on 27 August 2013 due to a lack of available 3D content.

References

Defunct television channels in Australia
3D television channels
Television channels and stations established in 2010
Television channels and stations disestablished in 2013
3D